Claude-François-Xavier Mercier de Compiègne (1763–1800) was a French writer and translator.

External links
 
 

1763 births
1800 deaths
18th-century French writers
18th-century French male writers
French booksellers
French erotica writers
French translators
French male non-fiction writers
French novelists
18th-century French translators